Bazaria umbrifasciella is a species of snout moth in the genus Bazaria. It was described by Émile Louis Ragonot in 1887. It is found in Uzbekistan.

References

Phycitini
Moths described in 1887
Moths of Asia
Taxa named by Émile Louis Ragonot